Bambusa burmanica is a species of Bambusa bamboo.

Distribution 
Bambusa burmanica is native to Northeast India, Bangladesh, Yunnan province of China and Peninsular Malaysia.

Description 
Bambusa burmanica grows up to height of 1.5 m to 2 m.

References 

burmanica
Flora of Assam (region)
Flora of Bangladesh
Flora of Peninsular Malaysia
Flora of Yunnan